Youth-led media is any effort created, planned, implemented, and reflected upon by young people in the form of media, including websites, newspapers, television shows and publications.

Movement
These efforts form the basis of an international movement born in the early 1970s in Ann Arbor, Michigan, U.S. by the publishing arm of a left-wing, teen-led organization called Youth Liberation of Ann Arbor, which existed from 1970 to 1980. One of its founders went on to form the New York City-based Youth Communication, a youth-led media program for young people in foster care. Another organization in the early movement was Children's Express, which operates programs around the world.

In the early 1990s this movement gained new expression in the United States in response to growing media bias against youth, i.e. the hyper-sensationalization of youth violence ala "superpredators", and continued to grow due to the "Columbine" shootings. The first online, teen-written newspaper, The Tattoo, began in 1994 with a promise of giving voice to teens. This movement features hundreds of individuals and organizations working across the United States to promote the roles of young people in society and in the media. Demonstrating the wide reach of youth-led media a program in Oakland, California called Youth Radio has been featured across national media outlets in the U.S., including NPR and PBS. Other examples include the Blunt Youth Radio Project, which provides an hour-long, weekly, youth-produced public affairs radio show on WMPG in Portland, Maine, and The Global Youth Review, an international literary magazine dedicated to amplifying youth voices.  A general interest magazine called Nang! is produced and distributed on a quarterly basis to 14- to 21-year-olds in London. Speak Africa is a Pan-African youth-produced multi-media communication initiative that works in print, radio, TV, the Internet and community theatre, and the Vera Project is an all-ages, non-profit youth music organization in Seattle, Washington. Coal Cracker youth-led news based in Mahanoy City, Pennsylvania, is a quarterly newspaper and website with content by young journalists from 12–18 years old.

In the United Kingdom, the BBC Young Reporter (formerly BBC News School Report) provides schools with the opportunity to host their own News Day in which students write news articles and interview people for a day. A student-led magazine named DGSChapter is produced by students of Dartford Grammar School who participate in the national scheme. National awards such as the Shine School Media Awards promote youth-led media as students compete for awards in a plethora of categories.

There are currently youth-led media programs and organizations around the world, including Central and South America, Africa, Europe, and Australia.

See also
Youth-led media (category)
Youth voice
Youth empowerment

External links
 AlphaGamma | Business portal for young professionals
 Coal Cracker youth-led news
 Headliners
 Youth Media at TakingITGlobal
 Youth Out Loud!
 Youth Journalism International
 The 18-to-24 Bracket | a journal of youth perspectives on politics
 Uth TV, Original media created by youth for youth
 SpunOut.ie Ireland's largest national youth media organisation
 FlindersStudents, a media service for young people at uni
 One80, Canada’s largest publication circulated by youth
 Elevate foster youth empowerment program that provides youth led media, CDs, DVDs
 Nonprofit Research Collection on Youth Media Published on IssueLab
 Roundhouse Radio A radio station run exclusively by young people (under 25) broadcasting 24/7 from London's legendary venue, The Roundhouse
 PLURAL+ Youth Video Festival
 What's Good? Online | Providing the UK's Online Entertainment, News, Events & Offers | The Future Youth Media Platform
 Colloquium News

References

 
Mass media
Media